Jean Pablo Mazaro (born August 26, 1988 in Descalvado), known as Jean Pablo, is a Brazilian footballer who plays for XV de Novembro as defender.

Career statistics

References

External links

1988 births
Living people
Brazilian footballers
Association football defenders
Campeonato Brasileiro Série D players
Ituano FC players
Clube Atlético Bragantino players
Clube Atlético Votuporanguense players
Rio Claro Futebol Clube players
Toledo Esporte Clube players
People from Descalvado